Academica Press is a scholarly and trade publisher of non-fiction, particularly research in the social sciences, humanities, education, law, public policy, international relations, and other disciplines. Founded by Robert Redfern-West and managed by him in the United States until 2017, it is now operated by a privately owned limited liability corporation and internationally focused. Its President and Publisher is the historian and critic Paul du Quenoy. In addition to its main list of publications, Academica publishes several imprints in subject areas of special interest, including St. James's Studies in World Affairs, W. B. Sheridan Law Books, Bethesda Scientific, and an Irish studies series under the imprint of Maunsel, the original publisher of James Joyce and William Butler Yeats.

Recent Academica authors include:

James Allan, Australian legal scholar, Garrick Professor of Law at the University of Queensland
Robert Ayres, American physicist, economist, and Shakespeare scholar; INSEAD professor
Julie Burchill, British journalist and writer
James Flynn, American-New Zealand professor of political studies, intelligence researcher, and namesake of the "Flynn effect"
Jack Foley, American poet
Seymour Itzkoff, American psychologist
George Maior, Romanian diplomat and former chief of Romania's national intelligence service
Andrew Napolitano, American judge, legal analyst, and columnist
Francis Martin O'Donnell, Irish, United Nations, and Sovereign Military Order of Malta diplomat and heraldist
Martin Palouš, Ambassador of the Czech Republic to the United States and United Nations, leading anti-communist dissident, and Senior Fellow at Florida International University
Irina Papkova, international relations and religion scholar
Juliana Geran Pilon, political philosopher and Senior Fellow of the Alexander Hamilton Institute for the Study of Western Civilization
Marion Smith, President of the Common Sense Society
George Szamuely, British political scientist
Corey Evan Thompson, Herman Melville scholar and critic
Count Nikolai Tolstoy, Anglo-Russian historian
Giuseppe Valditara, Minister of Education of Italy
Akhmed Zakayev, Prime Minister of Chechnya's government-in-exile, military commander, and independence leader in Chechnya's wars against Russia

Academica Press also publishes the Journal of Intelligence and Cyber Security, edited by University of Cambridge academic Professor Neil Kent.

References

External links

Academic publishing companies
Publishing companies of the United States
Companies based in Washington, D.C.
Book publishing companies based in London